Dexter Tiewon Gore Jr. (born September 6, 1993), better known by his stage name Famous Dex, is an American rapper and singer. His 2018 debut album Dex Meets Dexter peaked at number 12 on the Billboard 200, while its singles "Pick It Up" (featuring ASAP Rocky) and "Japan" peaked at number 54 and 28 respectively on the Billboard Hot 100.

Early life
Dexter Tiewon Gore Jr. was born on September 6, 1993, in the Harlem neighborhood of Manhattan, New York City, but had since moved to Chicago, Illinois, and was raised in the city's Englewood neighborhood on the South Side. He decided to pursue music after the death of his mother in September 2014. In 2016, he tattooed a pink ribbon on his face to commemorate his mother after she died of breast cancer.

Career

2015–2016: Early mixtapes and signing to Rich the Kid's label 
In 2015, he self-released his first mixtape, Never Seen It Coming. Later in 2015, he released his second mixtape, Dexter's Laboratory (not to be confused with the animated television series of the same name).

In early 2016, Gore released his third and fourth mixtapes, Drippy and #OhhMannGoddDamn.

In March 2016, Gore announced that he was officially signed to Rich the Kid's label, Rich Forever Music. Shortly thereafter, Gore and Rich released their collaborative effort, Rich Forever. This was followed by three sequels, with the third exclusively featuring Rich Forever newcomer New York rapper Jay Critch. In October 2016, Gore was featured in the Soulja Boy music video, "Draco".

2017–2018: Dex Meets Dexter 
In March 2017, Gore announced the title of his debut album, Dex Meets Dexter. The album was released on April 6, 2018.

In October 2017, he released "Pick It Up" featuring ASAP Rocky as the first single from the album, which peaked at number 54 on the Billboard Hot 100, becoming his first song to chart. The album's second single "Japan" was released on March 16, 2018. On March 30, 2018, he released the single "Light" featuring Drax Project.

The single "Nervous" which features Lil Baby, Jay Critch, and Rich The Kid was released on September 21, 2018.

2019–present: Dexter 2031 EP and Diana 

On May 8, 2019, the single "Fully Loaded" was released which featured Lil Gotit. A music video was released later on May 27, 2019. Gore appeared on the Rich Forever Music compilation album, Rich Forever 4, which was released on August 2, 2019, and featured new artists signed to the label.

On November 1, 2019, Gore suffered a epileptic seizure during a performance at 1 OAK in West Hollywood, California. A representative later confirmed he was recovering.

On December 31, 2019, Gore released the EP, Dexter 2031, on SoundCloud. The single "What I Like" which features Tyga and Rich the Kid was released on April 3, 2020. On July 23, he released the single "Couped Out" with Fivio Foreign. In August 2020, he released the single "Hold On". On October 9, he released the album Diana.

Rich the Kid announced in January 2021 that Gore was in a rehabilitation clinic.

Controversies

Shocktoberfest controversy
In 2018, prior to the University of California, Irvine's Shocktoberfest music event, the university's Student Services was criticized for allowing Gore to perform at the event after a security video from two years prior emerged showing Gore chasing his girlfriend down a hallway and then hitting her several times.  Gore was permitted to perform despite the domestic abuse revelations, and while doing so jumped into the crowded audience causing safety barriers to be knocked over by a rush of audience members.  The event was shut down as a result. While leaving the event, it was alleged someone in Gore's vehicle pointed a gun at students.  According to the university's official campus newspaper, "Gore bragged online about shutting down the event saying, 'I just shut the show down. And it was all positive vibes.'"

Social network 
On December 22, 2018, Gore uploaded a video post to his Instagram page in which he made racially charged jokes at the expense of an elderly Indian American Hindu cashier at a gas station he was frequenting with a friend. During the video, he remarks "Witcho' lil", referring to the man's tilaka on his forehead. He then adds "That's a mark of Buddha in between yo' face?", laughing along with his friend.

Substance usage
Dex has struggled with substance abuse throughout his career. Following release of a video showing him in an extremely inebriated position  fans expressed concern. Shortly after he checked into a rehabilitation facility.

Arrest
In June 2021, Gore was arrested while appearing in court for violating a protection order put in place by his former partner. He was subsequently sentenced to 364 days in a Los Angeles, California, jail on September 1, 2021.

Discography

Studio albums

Extended plays

Mixtapes

Collaborative mixtapes

Singles

Guest appearances

References

External links
 

1993 births
Living people
African-American male rappers
Midwest hip hop musicians
Rappers from Chicago
Songwriters from Illinois
Trap musicians
21st-century African-American people
American male songwriters
Rappers from Manhattan
Songwriters from New York (state)
Musicians from New York City